Elk Creek is a stream in Clayton County, Iowa and Delaware County, Iowa, in the United States. It is a tributary of the Turkey River.

Elk Creek was so named in 1834 when a pioneer saw a herd of elk there.

See also
List of rivers of Iowa

References

Rivers of Clayton County, Iowa
Rivers of Delaware County, Iowa
Rivers of Iowa